Major General David Leslie Burden,  (born 14 July 1943) is a former British Army officer who served as Military Secretary from 1997 to 1999.

Military career
Burden was educated at Portsmouth Grammar School and commissioned into the Royal Army Service Corps in 1964. He was posted to Germany and to Northern Ireland and transferred to the Royal Army Ordnance Corps under the McLeod Reorganisation of Army Logistics in 1965. He attended the Army Staff College in 1975, the National Defence College in 1981 and the Royal College of Defence Studies in 1988.

In the mid to late 1970s Burden twice served in the Ministry of Defence and undertook two tours with the Allied Command Mobile Force Land, one in the headquarters and one in command of a logistic company. In 1981 he became Chief Personnel and Logistic Officer for the United Nations Peacekeeping Force in Cyprus and in 1983 he became Commanding Officer of the Ordnance Battalion for 1st Armoured Division. In 1985 he was made Deputy Chief of Staff at Headquarters British Forces Hong Kong and in 1989 he became Assistant Chief of Staff at Headquarters British Army of the Rhine. In 1991 he became Director General Resettlement in the Ministry of Defence and in 1992 he became the first Director General of the Royal Logistic Corps. In 1997 he was appointed Military Secretary.

On retirement from the Army Burden served as Receiver General of Westminster Abbey from 1998 until 2008.

Family
Burden is married to Susan and they have two daughters.

References

 

1943 births
Graduates of the Staff College, Camberley
Graduates of the Royal College of Defence Studies
British Army major generals
British military personnel of The Troubles (Northern Ireland)
Commanders of the Order of the British Empire
Commanders of the Royal Victorian Order
Companions of the Order of the Bath
Living people
People educated at The Portsmouth Grammar School
Royal Army Service Corps officers
Royal Army Ordnance Corps officers